John B. McAuliffe (c. 1892 – October 29, 1954) was an American football player and coach.  He served as the head football coach at Marquette University in 1916, at Colby College from 1920 to 1921, and at Catholic University from 1925 to 1929.

Playing career
McAuliffe played college football at Dartmouth College from 1913 to 1915 under head coach Frank Cavanaugh.  He was the captain of the team in 1915.  That season, McAuliffe was a second team selection by Walter Eckersall of the Chicago Tribune to the All-America Team.

Coaching career
McAuliffe was the 11th head football coach at Marquette University in Milwaukee, Wisconsin and he held that position for the 1916 season.  His coaching record at Marquette was 4–3–1.  He continued on at Marquette as an assistant to John J. Ryan in 1917 and 1918.  After serving as line coach at his alma mater, Dartmouth, in 1924 under head coach Jesse Hawley, McAuliffe was appointed as head football coach at  Catholic University in June 1925.  He was living in Fitchburg, Massachusetts at the time.

Death
McAuliffe died at the age of 62, on October 29, 1954, in Worcester, Massachusetts.

Head coaching record

References

Year of birth missing
1890s births
1954 deaths
American football tackles
Catholic University Cardinals athletic directors
Catholic University Cardinals football coaches
Colby Mules football coaches
Dartmouth Big Green football coaches
Dartmouth Big Green football players
Marquette Golden Avalanche football coaches
Sportspeople from Fitchburg, Massachusetts